Eleanor "Len" Winthrop Young (1897–1994) was a British climber. She was a co-founder and the first president of the Pinnacle Club, a British women's climbing club, and made numerous ascents in the Alps and many in the United Kingdom.

Early life
Eleanor Slingsby was born in 1897 in Carleton-in-Craven, West Riding of Yorkshire. She was the youngest of five children born to William Cecil Slingsby (1849–1920), a mill owner and climber with extensive experience in Norway who became known as "the father of Norwegian mountaineering". Slingsby introduced each of his children to climbing at a young age around their local village.

In 1902, aged seven, Eleanor first met English mountaineer Geoffrey Winthrop Young (1876–1958) at her home in Carleton-in-Craven. She married him in 1918; by that time, he had lost a leg in the war and she helped him to regain his climbing abilities with an artificial leg. They moved to Cambridge in the 1920s, and had a son named Jocelin and a daughter named Marcia.

Climbing career
Winthrop Young first visited Norway with her father in 1921, on a climbing expedition that made her "ecstatic". The same year, she co-founded the Pinnacle Club, a club for women rock climbers that she felt would "serve the double purpose of promoting the independent development of the climbing art amongst women and of bringing into touch with one another those who are already united by the bond of common love for a noble sport". She served as the club's first president, and its inaugural meeting was at the Welsh pass Pen-y-Gwryd on 26 March 1921. An article published in the Alpine Journal after Winthrop Young's death noted that she had earned "her own special place in mountaineering history" for her involvement with the Pinnacle Club. She was on the committee of the Norwegian Alpine Club and the Fell & Rock Climbing Club.

Winthrop Young's climbing record included many ascents in Britain as well as several trips to the Alps, usually with her husband. Among these climbs in the Alps was a "spectacular" traverse of the Hohstock made by Eleanor, Geoffrey and Jocelin with a mountain guide in 1931. She also ascended the Rimpfischhorn in the same year. With a guide, she made the first ascent of the southernmost peak of the Fusshörner.

Published works
Winthrop Young edited her father's book, Norway: the Northern Playground (1941), to which her husband appended a biographical sketch of Slingsby. The couple also co-wrote a 1948 book, In Praise of Mountains.

Death
Winthrop Young died in January 1994.

References

1897 births
1994 deaths
People from Craven District
British rock climbers
English mountain climbers
Female climbers
Sportspeople from Yorkshire